Golkan-e Shahid Medani (also Romanized as Golkān-e Shahīd Medanī; also known as Golkān) is a village in Sangan Rural District, in the Central District of Khash County, Sistan and Baluchestan Province, Iran. At the 2006 census, its population was 40, in 7 families.

References 

Populated places in Khash County